Aliger is a genus of sea snails, marine gastropod mollusks in the family Strombidae, the true conchs.

Aliger was previously a synonym of Lobatus Swainson, 1837

Species
Species within the genus Aliger include:
†Aliger dominator (Pilsbry & Johnson, 1917) 
†Aliger galliformis (Pilsbry & Johnson, 1917) 
Aliger gallus (Linnaeus, 1758):
Aliger gigas (Linnaeus, 1758)
Species brought into synonymy:
Aliger costatus (Gmelin, 1791): synonym of Lobatus costatus (Gmelin, 1791)

References

 Thiele, J. (1929-1935). Handbuch der systematischen Weichtierkunde. Jena, Gustav Fischer, 1154 pp. Vol. 1 part 1: 1-376 [between 4 September and 21 October 1929]; Vol. 1 part 2: 377-778 [before 31 October 1931]; Vol. 2 part 3: 779-1022 [before 19 January 1934]; Vol. 2 part 4: i-iv, 1023–1154, i-vi for volume 1 [before 27 March 1935]. Dates from Bieler, R. & Boss, K. J. (1989), Nemouria, 34.
 Liverani V. (2014) The superfamily Stromboidea. Addenda and corrigenda. In: G.T. Poppe, K. Groh & C. Renker (eds), A conchological iconography. pp. 1-54, pls 131–164. Harxheim: Conchbooks.
 Maxwell S.J., Dekkers A.M., Rymer T.L. & Congdon B.C. (2020). Towards resolving the American and West African Strombidae (Mollusca: Gastropoda: Neostromboidae) using integrated taxonomy. The Festivus. 52(1): 3-38.

Strombidae
Gastropod genera
Taxa named by Johannes Thiele (zoologist)
Taxa described in 1929